Lieutenant general (Lt Gen), is the second-highest rank of the Nigerian Army and generally it is the highest active rank as the Nigerian army do not have any appointment in the rank of full general but in the case of the appointment of Chief of Defence Staff, the rank of full general is given (if the chief is appointed from the army and not from the navy or the air force). It is the equivalent of a multinational three-star rank.
 
The rank of lieutenant general is usually held by the Chief of Army Staff.

Lieutenant general is a superior rank to major general, but subordinate to a (full) general. The rank has a NATO rank code of OF-8, equivalent to a vice-admiral in the Nigerian Navy and an air marshal in the Nigerian Air Force (NAF) and the air forces of many Commonwealth countries.
 
The rank insignia is an eagle and a six-pointed star over a crossed sabre and baton.

Usage
Ordinarily, the lieutenant general rank is usually held by only the Chief of Army Staff which implies there is usually only one serving lieutenant general in the Army at a time but there have been some occasions where there were more than one lieutenant-general in the Army like the case of Lt-Gen Jeremiah Useni, who was the Federal Capital Territory (FCT) Minister under General Sani Abacha, while, Lt-Gen Ishaya Bamaiyi was the Chief of Army Staff. Also, there was the case of Lt-Gen Abel Akale, who was the Commandant of the Nigerian Defence Academy (NDA), Kaduna, at the time Lt-Gen Martin Luther Agwai was the Chief of Army Staff. Maj-Gen Chikadibia Isaac Obiakor was also promoted to Lt-Gen and made Commander of United Nations (UN) Peace Keeping Operations while Lt-Gen Agwai was still Army Chief in December 2005. The most recent case was that of the promotion of Maj-Gen Lamidi Adeosun to the rank of lieutenant general in July 2019 while Lt-Gen Tukur Buratai was still Army Chief.

During the military rule, the Chief of Staff, Supreme Headquarters and the Chief of General Staff (titles accorded to the deputy head of state and de facto vice president under different regimes) usually held a three-star rank like in the cases of Lt-Gens Olusegun Obasanjo and Oladipo Diya, both of whom never served as the Chief of Army Staff.

List of Nigerian Army Lieutenant generals
Since 1960, 32 officers have attained this rank. Among them, one officer, (Olusegun Obasanjo) attained this rank while he was Chief of Staff, Supreme Headquarters (de facto vice president), another officer, (Oladipo Diya) attained this rank before becoming Chief of General Staff (de facto vice president), 19 served as the Chief of Army Staff, 5 of them (Ipoola Alani Akinrinade, Gibson Sanda Jalo, Domkat Yah Bali, Sani Abacha and Oladipo Diya) served as Chief of Defence Staff while holding this rank, Bali and Abacha were later promoted to the rank of full General. 6 of them (Ipoola Alani Akinrinade, Gibson Sanda Jalo, Sani Abacha, Alexander Ogomudia, Martin Luther Agwai and Owoye Andrew Azazi) served in both positions.

See also

General (Nigeria)
Military ranks of Nigeria
List of Nigerian Army full generals

References 

Military ranks of Nigeria
 Nigeria